Kaja Juvan (born 25 November 2000) is a Slovenian tennis player who turned professional on 17 October 2016. Juvan has a career-high singles ranking of world No. 58, achieved on 6 June 2022. On 18 July 2022, she peaked at No. 97 in the WTA doubles rankings.

She won her maiden WTA Tour doubles title at the 2021 Winners Open in Cluj-Napoca, partnering with Natela Dzalamidze.

Junior career
On the junior tour, she achieved a career-high combined ranking of 5, in January 2017. She reached the semifinals of both the 2016 Wimbledon Championships and the 2016 US Open girls' doubles events. She was also a winner of the Orange Bowl in 2016.

Professional career

2019: Breakthrough, Grand Slam debut
She made her Grand Slam debut as a lucky loser at the French Open where she lost in the first round.

After winning her qualifier bracket, she reached the second round of the Wimbledon Championships where she lost a three-set match to Serena Williams.

2021: Australian Open and Wimbledon third rounds, top 60 debut

Juvan reached the third round of a Grand Slam championship at the 2021 Australian Open as a qualifier for the first time in her career, defeating 13th seed Johanna Konta in the first round, her first top-15 win, and Mayar Sherif in the second round. She lost to eventual Australian Open runner-up and 22nd seed, Jennifer Brady. As a result, she entered the top 100 at a career high of world No. 91, on 22 February 2021.

In June, she also reached the third round at Wimbledon where she defeated ninth seed Belinda Bencic in the first round, her second top-15 win for 2021, and French qualifier Clara Burel in the second round.

2022
At the Wimbledon Championships, she upset 23rd seed Beatriz Haddad Maia, the winner of two back-to-back grass-court titles and one of the most-in-form players.

Fed Cup
Juvan has represented Slovenia in Billie Jean King Cup competitions, where she has a win–loss record of 14–8.

Performance timelines

Only main-draw results in WTA Tour, Grand Slam tournaments, Fed Cup/Billie Jean King Cup and Olympic Games are included in win–loss records.

Singles
Current after the 2023 Monterrey Open.

Doubles

WTA career finals

Singles: 1 (runner-up)

Doubles: 1 (title)

ITF Circuit finals

Singles: 12 (7 titles, 5 runner–ups)

Doubles: 2 (1 title, 1 runner-up)

Junior Grand Slam finals

Girls' doubles: 1 (title)

Fed Cup/Billie Jean King Cup participation

Singles (10–5)

Doubles (4–3)

Record against other players

Top 10 wins

Notes

References

External links
 
 
 

2000 births
Living people
Slovenian female tennis players
Wimbledon junior champions
Grand Slam (tennis) champions in girls' doubles
Tennis players at the 2018 Summer Youth Olympics
Sportspeople from Ljubljana
Youth Olympic gold medalists for Slovenia